Baily may refer to:

People

Baily (surname)
Baily Cargill (born 1995), English footballer

Places
Baily (crater), lunar crater
Baily Head, Deception Island, Antarctica
Baily House, Newark, Delaware, United States
An area of Howth in North County Dublin, Ireland, where the Baily Lighthouse is located

Other uses
3115 Baily, main-belt asteroid
Baily's Beads, a feature of total solar eclipses

See also
 Bailey (disambiguation)
 Bailly (disambiguation)

ja:ベイリー